Quang Phong is a rural commune of Na Rì District, Bắc Kạn Province in Northeast Vietnam.

References 

Populated places in Bắc Kạn province
Communes of Bắc Kạn province